John McMahon (born 19 May 1964) is an English football coach and former player, currently assistant manager at Morecambe.

Playing career
McMahon came through an apprenticeship with Everton and was a regular in their reserves, but never appeared for the first team. He went on to play semi-professional football for Southport, South Liverpool, Altrincham (two spells), Witton Albion, Runcorn, Morecambe, Macclesfield Town, Knowsley United and Hyde United.

Coaching career 

McMahon spent eight years on the coaching staff of Tranmere Rovers, where he had two spells as caretaker manager, in the 2003–04 season and at the end of the 2005–06 season.

He moved to become first-team coach at Shrewsbury Town in June 2006, and was made assistant manager in September 2007. During this period he completed his UEFA Pro Licence in coaching during 2006. On 3 March 2008 he was appointed caretaker manager, after the departure of manager Gary Peters. The appointment of Paul Simpson on 12 March saw him resume the assistant role.

On 8 June 2009, McMahon was appointed reserve team coach of Liverpool, replacing Gary Ablett. He took charge of the reserve team for the first time on 18 July 2009, when the a Liverpool XI beat Aberystwyth Town 4–1 in a friendly. On 11 March 2011 it was announced that he would no longer be a coach at Liverpool.

In June 2011 he rejoined the coaching staff at Tranmere as first team coach. McMahon was appointed caretaker manager of Tranmere in February 2014, after the suspension of Ronnie Moore. He left the club in August 2014.

He has been assistant manager at Morecambe under Derek Adams since October 2019. Following Adams' departure in June 2021, McMahon stayed on as assistant to Stephen Robinson.

Personal life
McMahon is the younger brother of Liverpool and England player Steve McMahon.

References

1964 births
Living people
Footballers from Liverpool
English footballers
Association football midfielders
Everton F.C. players
Southport F.C. players
South Liverpool F.C. players
Altrincham F.C. players
Witton Albion F.C. players
Runcorn F.C. Halton players
Morecambe F.C. players
Macclesfield Town F.C. players
Knowsley United F.C. players
Hyde United F.C. players
National League (English football) players
Northern Premier League players
English football managers
Tranmere Rovers F.C. managers
Shrewsbury Town F.C. managers
English Football League managers
Liverpool F.C. non-playing staff
Tranmere Rovers F.C. non-playing staff
Morecambe F.C. non-playing staff